Mahatma Gandhi Marine National Park is a national park of India near Wandoor on the Andaman Islands. It belongs to the South Andaman administrative district, part of the Indian union territory of Andaman and Nicobar Islands.

History 
The park was created on 24 May 1983 under the Wildlife Protection Act of 1972 to protect marine life such as the corals and nesting sea turtles prevalent in the area.  It was placed under the protection of the Chief Wildlife Warden of the forest department of the Andaman and Nicobar Islands and it is open creeks running through the park area were a special attraction.

Geography
There are 2 major island groups in the park: the Labyrinth Islands and the Twin Islands.
The marine park covers 281.5 km2 made up of 17 islands and the open sea creeks running through the area. There is a chance for ecotourism on the islands Jolly Buoy and Red Skin.
The islands belong to the Rutland Archipelago and are located between Rutland Island and South Andaman Island.

Ecosystems  of the Island
Most of the coral reefs in the park are fringing reefs.  The type and composition of vegetation vary from island to island.  Most notably there you can see a difference between the tourist islands which suffer more anthropocentric change and others which do not.  There are also some islands more isolated or protected from the effects of weather in the Bay of Bengal. Tarmugli, the largest island, is covered with thick mangrove vegetation, sand covered beaches, uprooted trees and sheet rocks.  Twin Islands are an important breeding ground for turtles within the park.

List of Islands
Mahatma Gandhi Marine National Park has some 20 islands and rocks.

Administration
Politically, all islands are part of Port Blair Taluk.

Demographics
The islands are on uninhabited land, but there is a population of 7300 living in 10 adjacent villages (mainly Manglutan and Wandoor)

Image gallery

References 

 Information about Mahatma Gandhi Marine National Park 
 11 Status of Coral Reefs of Mahatma Gandhi Marine National Park, Wandoor, Andamans by K Dorairaj and R. Soundararajan

National parks in the Andaman and Nicobar Islands
Marine parks of India
1983 establishments in the Andaman and Nicobar Islands
Protected areas established in 1983
Tourist attractions in the Andaman and Nicobar Islands
Uninhabited islands of India
Islands of India
Islands of the Bay of Bengal